Sebastian Stasiak (born 8 September 1994) is a Polish modern pentathlete. He competed in the men's event at the 2020 Summer Olympics.

References

External links
 

1994 births
Living people
Polish male modern pentathletes
Modern pentathletes at the 2020 Summer Olympics
Olympic modern pentathletes of Poland
People from Zielona Góra